Znowhite or Znöwhite were an American thrash/speed metal band who have been credited for helping to pioneer thrash metal in Chicago.

History

Formation 
In 1982, the heavy metal band Znowhite was founded by two African American brothers, guitarist Ian Tafoya and drummer Sparks Tafoya (real names Greg Fulton and Tony Heath), along with cousin Nicky Tafoya (real name Curtis Fulton) on bass. Nicole Lee (real name Sue Sharp) joined the group soon after as lead vocalist. The band originally performed under the title Snowhite, but later replaced the S with a Z. They independently released their three-song flexi disc which featured the song "Hellbent". This caught the attention of Metal Blade Records founder Brian Slagel. On the strength of the recording Znowhite landed a spot on volume three of the Metal Massacre compilation, which helped give them some exposure.

Lineup changes and disbandment 
After Znowhite's initial success, Nicole, Ian, and Sparks decided to replace then bassist Amp Dawg. In 1985, Scott Schafer joined Znowhite taking over the bass duties. Four years of grueling back-to-back tours of America and Canada produced the independently released live album Live Suicide. Back in their hometown of Chicago the band started work on what would be the last Znowhite release, their magnum opus, Act of God. Toward the end of the recording sessions Nicole Lee made the decision to leave Znowhite. Act of God was released in 1988 through Roadrunner Records. An extensive American tour followed the album's release and featured Sentinel Beast vocalist Debbie Gunn (real name Debbie Gunderson) and drummer John Slattery - formerly of the band Tools Of Ignorance. Gunn left after the tours due to health issues. Fulton, Schafer, and Slattery went on to form Cyclone Temple When Cyclone Temple disbanded Fulton, Schafer, and Fulton's brother, former Znowhite drummer Tony Heath, formed a new group named Rebels Without Applause. Gunn went on to sing for the group Ice Age and, later, to reform Sentinel Beast.

Band members 

Last known lineup
 Greg Fulton (aka "Ian Tafoya") – guitars (1982–1989)
 Scott Schafer – bass (1985–1989), drums (1987–1988)
 John Slattery – drums (1988–1989)
 Brian Troch – vocals (1989)

Former members
 Curtis Fulton (aka "Nicky Tafoya") – bass (1982–1983)
 Tony Heath (aka "Sparks Tafoya") – drums (1982–1986)
 Sue Sharp (aka "Nicole Lee") – vocals (1982–1988)
 Amp Dawg – bass (1984)
 Alex Olvera – bass (1987)
 Debbie Gunderson (aka "Debbie Gunn") – vocals (1988–1989)

Timeline

Discography

Studio albums 
 All Hail to Thee (EP, 1984)
 Kick 'Em When They're Down (EP, 1985)
 Act of God (1988)

Live albums 
 Live Suicide (EP, 1986)

Compilation albums 
 ZnöWhite (1998)
 ZnöWhite (2007 re-issue with albums All Hail to Thee + Kick 'Em When They're Down + Live Suicide)

Singles 
 Live for the Weekend (1983)

Other appearances 
 "Hell Bent" on Metal Massacre III (1983)
 "Baptized by Fire" on Stars on Thrash (1988)

References

Sources 
 Christe, Ian (2003). Sound of the Beast: The Complete Headbanging History of Heavy Metal. HarperCollins. 

American speed metal musical groups
American thrash metal musical groups
Musical groups established in 1982
Musical groups from Chicago
Heavy metal musical groups from Illinois
1982 establishments in Illinois